Peyton Cole Battenfield (born August 10, 1997) is an American professional baseball pitcher in the Cleveland Guardians organization.

Amateur career
Battenfield attended Verdigris High School in Verdigris, Oklahoma. As a senior he was The Oklahoman All-State Baseball Player of the Year. After high school he played college baseball at Oklahoma State University.

Professional career

Houton Astros
Battenfield was selected by the Houston Astros in the ninth round of the 2019 Major League Baseball draft. He made his professional debut that season with the Tri-City ValleyCats, going 2–1 with a 1.60 earned run average over 14 starts.

Tampa Bay Rays
On January 9, 2020, Battenfield was traded from the Astros along with Cal Stevenson to the Tampa Bay Rays for Austin Pruitt. He did not play a minor league game in 2020 since the season was cancelled due to the COVID-19 pandemic. Battenfield began the 2021 with the High-A Bowling Green Hot Rods before being promoted to the Double-A Montgomery Biscuits.

Cleveland Indians / Guardians
On July 30, 2021, the Rays traded Battenfield to the Cleveland Indians in exchange for Jordan Luplow and D. J. Johnson. After the trade, he was assigned to the Double-A Akron RubberDucks. Over 21 games (19 starts) between the three teams, he went 7–1 with a 2.53 earned run average and 131 strikeouts over 103 innings.

Battenfield began the 2022 season with the Triple-A Columbus Clippers. The Guardians selected Battenfield's contract as a COVID-19 replacement player on August 12, 2022. He was returned to Columbus on August 15, 2022.

References

External links

Baseball players from Oklahoma
1997 births
Living people
Akron RubberDucks players
Bowling Green Hot Rods players
Columbus Clippers players
Montgomery Biscuits players
Oklahoma State Cowboys baseball players
Tri-City ValleyCats players